James Strachan may refer to:

 James Strachan (Australian politician) (1810–1875), Australian politician and merchant
 James Strachan (educator) (1883–1973), New Zealand school principal
 James Strachan (ice hockey) (1876–1939), Canadian ice hockey executive
 James Strachan (programmer), developer of the Apache Groovy programming language
 James Frederick Strachan (1894–1978), Scottish law lord
 James McGill Strachan (1808–1870), lawyer, business and political figure in Canada West